is a Japanese video game creator and illustrator who worked for Idea Factory. She has designed and illustrated characters for various games and print media. She is best known for illustrating the Hyperdimension Neptunia video game series, published by Idea Factory and developed by Compile Heart, as well as the Date A Live light novel series, written by Kōshi Tachibana.

Biography
Tsunako joined Idea Factory in 2007, beginning as a general game sprite creator for games such as Spectral Gene and Cross Edge. She later became the lead character designer for the Hyperdimension Neptunia game series, and signed a deal with light novel author Kōshi Tachibana as the illustrator for Date A Live. She has also made guest illustrations for games such as Sei Madou Monogatari. She ranked 6th on the Kono Light Novel ga Sugoi! 2014 Top Illustrator Rankings.

On December 1, 2018, Tsunako left her role at Idea Factory and decided to move out of the city. She noted on her blog that her reasoning for this was one of her family members being in poor physical condition. She is still set to work at Idea Factory as a freelance illustrator.

Main works

Video games
Spectral Gene (2007, PS2): in-game sprite designer
Spectral Force Genesis (2008, NDS): character designs
Cross Edge (2008, PS3/X360): character designs, in-game sprite illustrator
Trinity Universe (2009, PS3): character designs and official art
Hyperdimension Neptunia (2010, PS3): character designs and official art
Hyperdimension Neptunia Mk2 (2011, PS3)
Hyperdimension Neptunia Victory (2012, PS3)
Hyperdimension Idol Neptunia PP (2013, PSVita)
Hyperdimension Neptunia Re;Birth 1 (2013, PSVita)
Date A Live: Rinne Utopia (2013, PS3): in-game sprite illustrator
Fairy Fencer F (2013, PS3): character designs and official art
Hyperdevotion Noire: Goddess Black Heart (2014, PSVita)
Hyperdimension Neptunia Re;Birth 2: Sisters Generation (2014, PSVita)
Date A Live: Ars Install (2014, PS3)
Hyperdimension Neptunia U: Action Unleashed (2014, PSVita)
Hyperdimension Neptunia Re;Birth 3: V Century (2014, PSVita)
Fairy Fencer F: Advent Dark Force (2015, PS4)
Megadimension Neptunia VII (2015, PS4)
Date A Live Twin Edition: Rio Reincarnation (2015, PSVita)
MegaTagmension Blanc + Neptune vs. Zombies (2015, PSVita)
Superdimension Neptune vs. Sega Hard Girls (2015, PSVita)
Cyberdimension Neptunia: 4 Goddesses Online (2017, PS4)
Megadimension Neptunia VIIR (2017, PS4)
Date A Live: Rio Reincarnation HD (2017, PS4)
Super Neptunia RPG (2018, PS4, Switch)

Light novels
Date A Live (2011–2020): character designs and novel illustrations
: character designs and novel illustrations
King's Proposal (2021–present): character design and novel illustrations

Anime
Engage Kiss (2022): character designs

Manga
マンガでわかる! 東大式麻雀入門 （監修:井出洋介、2007年 池田書店）
マンガでわかる! 東大式麻雀入門 役の覚え方入門 （監修:井出洋介、2010年 池田書店）
マンガでわかる! 東大式麻雀入門 勝つ打ち方入門 （監修:井出洋介、2010年 池田書店）

Footnotes

References

External links

 

1986 births
People from Okayama Prefecture
Video game artists
Living people
Japanese video game designers
Anime character designers